WAMB (1130 AM) is a radio station  broadcasting a mix of adult contemporary and soft adult contemporary formats. Licensed to Brazil, Indiana, United States, the station serves the Terre Haute area. It first began broadcasting in 1982 under the call sign WWCM. The station is currently owned by David Crooks, through licensee DLC Media.

1130 AM is a clear-channel frequency shared by Canada and The United States.

History
The station went on the air as WWCM on July 14, 1982. On June 6, 1985, the station changed its call sign to WSDM; again on October 15, 1987, to WBZL; on February 15, 1992, to WSDM; on January 31, 2000, to WSDX; on September 24, 2012, to WFNF; and on August 22, 2017, to the current WAMB.

On September 1, 2017, WAMB changed formats from sports to adult standards, branded as "Timeless Classics 1130 AM 99.5 FM".

On September 15, 2021, WAMB changed their format from adult standards to a mix of soft adult contemporary and adult contemporary, branded as "The Breeze".

1300 kilohertz was a frequency previously used for WIBQ; this frequency is no longer used in the Terre Haute market.

Previous logos

References

External links
WAMB Facebook

AMB (AM)
Soft adult contemporary radio stations in the United States